Swaton is a village and civil parish in the North Kesteven district of Lincolnshire, England. Swaton Fen lies to the east. The Eau river rises to the west and runs through the village until it joins the Forty Foot Drain.

Before the draining of the Fens the Eau river was navigable and a large inland port existed close to the current bridge. The Roman Car Dyke runs to the east of the village. Roman brick pits remain. 

The name comes from "Suavetone" or "Swaffa’s Farmstead".

The cruciform Church of St Michael is a Grade I listed building.

Nichola de la Haye, a lady who served as High Sheriff of Lincolnshire for King John, died in Swaton on 20 November 1230.

In 1240 William II Longespée and his wife Idonea, Nichola's granddaughter, applied for and were granted a royal charter to run a Friday market in the village. This grant was unsuccessfully challenged by residents of Folkingham and Sleaford who feared it would damage their own Saturday and Monday markets.

Swaton Vintage Day is held each June. The village also hosts the annual World Egg Throwing competition. Egg throwing in this village started circa 1322 when the new Abbot of Swaton, controlling all poultry in the village, used them to provide eggs as alms to those that attended church.  When the Eau was in flood these were hurled over the swollen river to waiting peasants.

References

External links

 St Michael's church
 Parish council
 World Egg Throwing Federation
 Churchview Equestrian

Hamlets in Lincolnshire
Civil parishes in Lincolnshire
North Kesteven District